Reynald Pedros (born 10 October 1971) is a French professional football manager and former player who played as a midfielder. He currently manages the Morocco women's national team.

Club career
Pedros was born in Orléans, Loiret, and is of Portuguese and Spanish descent. He played as a left-footed attacking midfielder, formed in Nantes. He was part of the magic trio of FC Nantes with Patrice Loko and Nicolas Ouédec. He won the Ligue 1 title with Nantes in 1995. The following year he reached the semi-finals of the UEFA Champions League.

International career
Pedros represented the France national team. His career bears some similarity to David Ginola's – a mistake in the last 1994 FIFA World Cup qualifying match leading to French elimination, and subsequently being dropped from the national team.

Before UEFA Euro 1996, he was considered one of the best French midfielders, on par with Zinedine Zidane, and was selected for the tournament. France reached the semi-final to face the Czech Republic, and the two teams could not be separated over ninety minutes. The match thus went into extra time and subsequently a penalty shoot-out. After five successful penalties for each team, Pedros was to take the first of the penalties in sudden death. His shot was weak and slow, and was easily saved by the Czech goalkeeper, Petr Kouba. Miroslav Kadlec came to take the next penalty, scored it, and knocked France out of the tournament.

Following this elimination, Pedros was made a pariah by the media and was greatly disliked by French fans. He attempted to make a comeback, in Ligue 2, but he was never able to come back to the top of his game.

Managerial career
On 2 June 2017, Pedros took over as head coach of Olympique Lyonnais Féminin. He led them to retain the Division 1 Féminine championship for the 12th and 13th time. He also succeeded in guiding the team to retaining the UEFA Women's Champions League for the 3rd and 4th time.

In November 2020, Pedros became the coach of the Moroccan women's national team. 
This recruitment takes place in the context of the massive effort made by the FRMF and its President Fouzi Lekjaa to develop women's football in Morocco, particularly mass football, with the aim of becoming a stronghold of women's football at continental and world level. His first tournament was the 2022 Women's Africa Cup of Nations, which would mark a historic milestone as he guided Morocco to reach the final of the WAFCON for the first time in its only third appearance, including the famous penalty win over African titan Nigeria in the semi-finals, which was seen as a redemption for his penalty defeat in Euro 1996.

Career statistics

International goals
Scores and results list France's goal tally first, score column indicates score after each Pedros goal.

Honours

Manager 
Lyon

 Division 1 Féminine: 2017–18, 2018–19
 Coupe de France Féminine: 2018–19
 UEFA Women's Champions League: 2018–19, 2019–20

References

External links

 
 
 
 
 

1971 births
Living people
Footballers from Orléans
French footballers
Association football midfielders
FC Nantes players
Olympique de Marseille players
Parma Calcio 1913 players
S.S.C. Napoli players
Olympique Lyonnais players
Montpellier HSC players
Toulouse FC players
SC Bastia players
Al-Khor SC players
Ligue 1 players
Serie A players
Qatar Stars League players
Competitors at the 1993 Mediterranean Games
Mediterranean Games medalists in football
Mediterranean Games bronze medalists for France
France under-21 international footballers
France international footballers
UEFA Euro 1996 players
French football managers
Olympique Lyonnais Féminin managers
French expatriate footballers
Expatriate footballers in Italy
Expatriate footballers in Qatar
Expatriate footballers in Switzerland
French expatriate sportspeople in Italy
French expatriate sportspeople in Qatar
French expatriate sportspeople in Switzerland
French people of Portuguese descent
French people of Spanish descent
Women's national association football team managers